Bae Jin-seok (born 16 November 1978) is a South Korean boxer. He competed in the men's welterweight event at the 2000 Summer Olympics.

References

1978 births
Living people
South Korean male boxers
Olympic boxers of South Korea
Boxers at the 2000 Summer Olympics
Place of birth missing (living people)
Welterweight boxers